"Pretty Boys And Pretty Girls" is the fifth single released by the American synth-pop band Book of Love. The song was the first single released prior to the band's second album Lullaby in 1988.

"Pretty Boys And Pretty Girls" became the band's highest-charting single at no. 90 in the Billboard Hot 100, and their only track that crossed over into mainstream pop. In the dance clubs, the song was a smash, and made it to no. 5 on the Hot Dance Club Play chart, spending 11 weeks on the chart.

"Pretty Boys And Pretty Girls" became one of the first songs ever to address the issue of the AIDS epidemic, featuring the lyrics of "strangers in the night exchanging glances, but sex is dangerous, I don't take my chances...safe sex, safe sex." 

The B-side to the single is a cover of Mike Oldfield's "Tubular Bells", originally became famous as the theme song in popular horror movie The Exorcist. For the track, the band sampled band member Lauren Roselli crying "Mother, make it stop!", channeling Linda Blair's role as Regan from the movie. For the 12" release of the single, "Tubular Bells" and "Pretty Boys And Pretty Girls" were mixed together as a fourteen-minute medley by Scott Blackwell and Bob Brockmann. The album Lullaby also begins with a shorter version of "Tubular Bells", which flows seamlessly into "Pretty Boys And Pretty Girls", the second track on the album.

A promotional video was shot and released for "Pretty Boys And Pretty Girls”; an alternate version of the video was also released using the medley edit of "Tubular Bells/Pretty Boys And Pretty Girls”.

Track listings

1988 7" Single   (Sire Records 7-27858)
Side A:
"Pretty Boys And Pretty Girls" (7" Edit) - 4:30

Side B:
"Tubular Bells" (7" Mix) - 4:23

1988 7" Promo Single   (Sire Records 7-27858-A)
Side A:
"Pretty Boys And Pretty Girls" (7" Edit) - 4:30

Side B:
"Pretty Boys And Pretty Girls" (7" Edit) - 4:30

1988 7" Promo Single   (PRO-S-3281)
Side A:
"Tubular Bells/Pretty Boys And Pretty Girls" (Medley Edit) - 4:25

Side B:
"Tubular Bells/Pretty Boys And Pretty Girls" (Medley Edit) - 4:25

1988 12" Maxi-Single   (Sire Records 0-20963)
Side A: 
"Pretty Boys And Pretty Girls" (Extended Mix) - 7:19
"Tubular Bells" (7" Mix) - 4:23
"Pretty Boys And Pretty Girls" (7" Mix) - 4:45
Side B:
"Tubular Bells/Pretty Boys And Pretty Girls" (Regan's House Medley) - 14:24

1988 Promo CD Single  (Sire Records PRO-CD-3197)
"Pretty Boys And Pretty Girls" (7" Mix) - 4:48
"Pretty Boys And Pretty Girls" (Extended Mix) - 7:20
"Tubular Bells/Pretty Boys And Pretty Girls" (Regan's House Medley) - 14:24
Interview - 3:43

Personnel 
"Pretty Boys And Pretty Girls" written by Theodore Ottaviano. "Tubular Bells" written by Mike Oldfield. All instruments arranged, programmed, and performed by Book of Love.

 Susan Ottaviano - Lead vocals
 Ted Ottaviano - Keyboards, tubular bells, backing vocals
 Lauren Roselli - Keyboards, backing vocals
 Jade Lee - Keyboards, Percussion, backing vocals

12" Sleeve Credits
 Produced by Flood and Ted Ottaviano
 Mastered by José Rodriguez at Sterling Sound
 "Pretty Boys And Pretty Girls" (Extended Mix) Remix, additional production an keyboards by Scott Blackwell and Bob Brockmann for Broadbeard Productions.Remix engineer: Bob Brockmann
 "Tubular Bells" (7" Mix)Mixed by Alan Meyerson
 "Pretty Boys And Pretty Gilrs" (7" Mix)Mixed by Alan Meyerson
 "Tubular Bells/Pretty Boys And Pretty Girls" (Regan's House Medley) Remix, additional production an keyboards by Scott Blackwell and Bob Brockmann for Broadbeard Productions.Remix engineers: Bob Brockmann and Hugo Dwyer
 Design by Jade Lee
 Photo by David LaChappelle

Charts

Official versions

Official versions of B-side "Tubular Bells"

" * " denotes that version is available as digital download

References

External links 
 
 
 

Book of Love (band) songs
1988 singles
Electronic songs
House music songs
LGBT-related songs
Sire Records singles
Songs about HIV/AIDS
1988 songs
Bisexuality-related songs